Betta strohi is a species of gourami endemic to Indonesia.  This species grows to a length of  TL.

Its specific name honours the German priest and missionary H. Stroh who returned to Germany with examples of this species of which he was the discoverer.

This taxon may be a synonym of Betta foerschi.

References

strohi
Taxa named by Dieter Schaller (aquarist)
Taxa named by Maurice Kottelat
Fish described in 1989